Luchesius Modestini, T.O.S.F. (also Luchesio, Lucchese, Lucesio, Lucio, or Luchesius of Poggibonsi) ( 1180 - 1260) is honored by tradition within the Franciscan Order as being, along with his wife, Buonadonna de' Segni, the first members of the Franciscan Order of Penance, most commonly referred to as the Third Order of St. Francis. His cultus was approved by the Holy See and he is honored as a Blessed by members of that Order.

Life
Modestini was a native of the region of Poggibonsi, declared an imperial city in that period by Frederick II, Holy Roman Emperor, according to some accounts as having been born in the small village of Gaggiano, which lay on the major road between that city and Castellina in Chianti. He was born around 1180-1182, making him a contemporary of Francis of Assisi. According to some accounts, as a young man he took up arms to serve in the Ghibelline army. Once stationed in Poggibonsi, which was experiencing a period of strong economic prosperity, he abandoned his military career and married a young woman of the city, Buona de' Segni—traditionally called Buonadonna. He then became a merchant, serving the large crowd of pilgrims who would travel along the road on which the city lay. His biographers state that, more than most merchants, he was so entirely and solely concerned with material success that he was generally reputed to be an avaricious man. His wife was said to be of a similar disposition.

At some point Modestini had a moment of conversion and realized how foolish it is to strive only for worldly goods. He began to practice works of mercy and to perform his religious obligations with fidelity. After Luchesius had put on the gray tunic or religious habit of a penitent, he rapidly advanced in holiness. He practiced ascetic austerities: often fasting on bread and water and sleeping on the hard floor.

With his wife joining him in following a life inspired by their faith, Modestini and Segni then had the option of separating and each entering a religious order. This was an ancient and respectable way for husbands and wives to develop their spiritual aspirations, commonly practiced by married couples who felt a deep desire to follow God. Possibly on the recommendation of Francis, they chose to remain living as a couple. In this they revived a way of sanctity for married couples.

Since they had no one to care for but themselves, and Modestini feared that in conducting his business he might relapse into covetousness, he gave up his business entirely. He and his wife divided everything among the poor and retained for themselves only so much land as would suffice for their support. Modestini tilled this with his own hands and gave the bounty that was beyond their need to the hungry.

About this time Francis of Assisi came to Poggibonsi, where the commune had given a church and house to his friars. After he preached a sermon on penance, many people desired to leave all and to follow his way of life. But Francis admonished them to persevere in their vocation, for he had in mind soon to give them a guide by which they could serve God perfectly even in the world, without entering into Religious life.

At Poggibonsi Francis visited Modestini, with whom he had become acquainted through former business transactions. Francis greatly rejoiced to find this avaricious man so altered, and Modestini, who had already heard about the activities of Francis, asked for special instructions for himself and his wife, so that they might lead a life in the world that would be pleasing to God. Francis then explained to them his plans for the establishment of an Order for lay people living in the spirit he preached; Luchesius and Buonadonna asked to be received into it at once. Thus, according to tradition, they became the first members of the Franciscan Order of Penance, which later came to be called the Third Order of St. Francis.

If Luchesius and Buonadonna were really the first Tertiaries (members of a Third Order), they must have become so not long after Francis founded his First Order in 1209. The first simple rule of life, which St. Francis gave to the first tertiaries at that time, was supplanted in 1221 by one which Cardinal Ugolino prepared in legal wording. And in the same year Pope Honorius III approved this rule verbally. For this reason the year 1221 is often given as the date of the founding of the Third Order of Saint Francis.

Hagiography
According to legend, Modestini's generosity to the poor knew no bounds, so that one day there was not even a loaf of bread for his own household. When still another poor man came, he asked his wife to look to see if there was not something they could find for him. That vexed her and she scolded him severely; his mortifications, she said, had well nigh crazed him, he would keep giving so long that they themselves would have to suffer hunger. Modestini asked her gently to please look in the pantry, for he trusted that Christ, who had multiplied loaves to bread to feed thousands, to bring the necessaries to the sick. When he did not have enough to supply all, he begged for more from others in behalf of the distressed.  Once he carried a sick cripple, whom he had found on the way, to his home on his shoulders. A frivolous young man met him, and asked him mockingly, "what poor devil is that you are carrying there on your back?" Modestini replied calmly. "I am carrying my Lord Jesus Christ." At once the young man's face became distorted, he cried out fearfully, and was dumb. Contritely he cast himself on his knees before Modestini, who restored his speech to him by means of the Sign of the Cross.

Death and veneration
When Modestini lay very ill, and there was no hope for his recovery, his wife said to him, "Implore God, who gave us to each other as companions in life, to permit us also to die together." Luchesius prayed as requested and Segni fell ill with a fever, from which she died even before her husband, after devoutly receiving the Holy Sacraments. They thus died together on April 28, 1260.

At Modestini's shrine in the Franciscan church at Poggibonsi it is claimed that many miracles have occurred. His continuous veneration as a Blessed was approved by Pope Gregory X in 1274.

References

1180s births
1260 deaths
People from Poggibonsi
12th-century venerated Christians
13th-century venerated Christians
Members of the Third Order of Saint Francis
Franciscan beatified people